Xiaocao'e (pinyin: xiǎo Cáo É) is a town located in the administrative territorial entity of Yuyao, Ningbo, Zhejiang province, China, established in 1949 and named after Cao E (130-143), the filial piety daughter who drowns when she tries to save her father. 

Xiaocao'e has a densely populated area of 33.4 square kilometres with a population of 40400 (2017) and the town contains eight administrative territorial entities, one of them is Cao'ecun (Cao E village). The town is situated approx 50 km from the harbour of Ningbo and is known for her industry, fruit, honey, mustard, pepper and cotton.

In October 2021 this town was chosen to one of the 1000 top towns in China at place 553.

Climate
The region around Xiaocao'e has a warm and temperate climate without a dry season but with a lot of rain in the hot summers, a climate classification Cfa according to Köppen. The average humidity is between 70-80%, with the highest humidity in June and the lowest in April. The average annual precipitation is 1778 millimetres. The wettest month is June, with an average of 285 mm of precipitation, and the driest month is January, with 60 mm of precipitation. The average temperature is between 5 degrees Celsius in winter (January) and 28 degrees Celsius in the middle of summer (July), with occasional peaks. Hours of sunshine range from 5 hours/day in winter and 10 hours/day in the summer.

Notes and references 

Yuyao
Township-level divisions of Zhejiang